Modern Hebrew (ʿivrít ḥadašá[h], lit. "Modern Hebrew" or "New Hebrew"), also known as Israeli Hebrew or  Israeli, and generally referred to by speakers simply as Hebrew, is the standard form of the Hebrew language spoken today. Spoken in ancient times, Ancient Hebrew, a member of the Canaanite branch of the Semitic language family, was supplanted as the Jewish vernacular by the western dialect of Aramaic beginning in the third century BCE, though it continued to be used as a liturgical and literary language. It was revived as a spoken language in the 19th and 20th centuries and is the official language of Israel. Of the Canaanite languages, Modern Hebrew is the only language spoken today.

Modern Hebrew is spoken by about nine million people, counting native, fluent and non-fluent speakers. Most speakers are citizens of Israel: about five million are Israelis who speak Modern Hebrew as their native language, 1.5 million are immigrants to Israel, 1.5 million are Arab citizens of Israel, whose first language is usually Arabic and half a million are expatriate Israelis or diaspora Jews living outside Israel.

The organization that officially directs the development of the Modern Hebrew language, under the law of the State of Israel, is the Academy of the Hebrew Language.

Name
The most common scholarly term for the language is "Modern Hebrew" ( ʿivrít ħadašá[h]). Most people refer to it simply as Hebrew ( Ivrit).

The term "Modern Hebrew" has been described as "somewhat problematic" as it implies unambiguous periodization from Biblical Hebrew.  (חיים רוזן) supported the now widely used term "Israeli Hebrew" on the basis that it "represented the non-chronological nature of Hebrew". In 1999, Israeli linguist Ghil'ad Zuckermann proposed the term "Israeli" to represent the multiple origins of the language.

Background

The history of the Hebrew language can be divided into four major periods:

 Biblical Hebrew, until about the 3rd century BCE; the language of most of the Hebrew Bible
 Mishnaic Hebrew, the language of the Mishnah and Talmud
 Medieval Hebrew, from about the 6th to the 13th century CE
 Modern Hebrew, the language of the modern State of Israel

Jewish contemporary sources describe Hebrew flourishing as a spoken language in the kingdoms of Israel and Judah, during about 1200 to 586 BCE. Scholars debate the degree to which Hebrew remained a spoken vernacular following the Babylonian captivity, when Old Aramaic became the predominant international language in the region.

Hebrew died out as a vernacular language somewhere between 200 and 400 CE, declining after the Bar Kokhba revolt of 132–136 CE, which devastated the population of Judea. After the exile, Hebrew became restricted to liturgical use.

Revival 

Hebrew had been spoken at various times and for a number of purposes throughout the Diaspora, and during the Old Yishuv it had developed into a spoken lingua franca among the Jews of Palestine. Eliezer Ben-Yehuda then led a revival of the Hebrew language as a mother tongue in the late 19th century and early 20th century. Modern Hebrew used Biblical Hebrew morphemes, Mishnaic spelling and grammar, and Sephardic pronunciation. Many idioms and calques were made from Yiddish. Its acceptance by the early Jewish immigrants to Ottoman Palestine was caused primarily by support from the organisations of Edmond James de Rothschild in the 1880s and the official status it received in the 1922 constitution of the British Mandate for Palestine. Ben-Yehuda codified and planned Modern Hebrew using 8,000 words from the Bible and 20,000 words from rabbinical commentaries. Many new words were borrowed from Arabic, due to the language's common Semitic roots with Hebrew, but changed to fit Hebrew phonology and grammar, for example the words  (sing.) /  (pl.) are now applied to "socks," a diminutive of the Arabic  ("socks"). In addition, early Jewish immigrants, borrowing from the local Arabs, and later immigrants from Arab lands introduced many nouns as loanwords from Arabic (such as na'ana, lubiya, hummus, etc.), as well as much of Modern Hebrew's slang. Despite Ben-Yehuda's fame as the renewer of Hebrew, the most productive renewer of Hebrew words was poet Haim Nahman Bialik.

One of the phenomena seen with the revival of the Hebrew language is that old meanings of nouns were occasionally changed for altogether different meanings, such as bardelas, which in Mishnaic Hebrew meant "hyena", but in Modern Hebrew it now means "cheetah;" or shezīph which is now used for "plum," but formerly meant "jujube." The word kishū’īm (formerly "cucumbers") is now applied to a variety of summer squash (Cucurbita pepo var. cylindrica), a plant native to the New World. Another example is the word kǝvīš, which now denotes a "street" or a "road," but is actually an Aramaic adjective meaning "trodden down; blazed", rather than a common noun. It was originally used to describe "a blazed trail." What is now a flower called in Modern Hebrew "kalanit" (Anemone coronaria) was, formerly, called in Hebrew "shoshanat ha-melekh" ("the king's flower").

For a simple comparison between the Sephardic and Yemenite versions of Mishnaic Hebrew, see Yemenite Hebrew.

Classification 
Modern Hebrew is classified as an Afroasiatic language of the Semitic family, the Canaanite branch of the Northwest Semitic subgroup, and a naturalistic planned language. While Modern Hebrew is largely based on Mishnaic and Biblical Hebrew as well as Sephardi and Ashkenazi liturgical and literary tradition from the Medieval and Haskalah eras and retains its Semitic character in its morphology and in much of its syntax, the consensus among scholars is that Modern Hebrew represents a fundamentally new linguistic system, not directly continuing any previous linguistic state.

Modern Hebrew is considered to be a koiné language based on historical layers of Hebrew that incorporates foreign elements, mainly those introduced during the most critical revival period between 1880 and 1920, as well as new elements created by speakers through natural linguistic evolution. A minority of scholars argue that the revived language had been so influenced by various substrate languages that it is genealogically a hybrid with Indo-European. Those theories have not been met with general acceptance, and the consensus among a majority of scholars is that Modern Hebrew, despite its non-Semitic influences, can correctly be classified as a Semitic language. Although European languages have had an impact on Modern Hebrew, the impact may often be overstated: Although Modern Hebrew has more of the features attributed to Standard Average European than Biblical Hebrew, it is still quite distant, and has fewer such features than Modern Standard Arabic.

Alphabet 

Modern Hebrew is written from right to left using the Hebrew alphabet, which is an abjad, or consonant-only script of 22 letters based on the "square" letter form, known as Ashurit (Assyrian), which was developed from the Aramaic script. A cursive script is used in handwriting. When necessary, vowels are indicated by diacritic marks above or below the letters known as Nikkud, or by use of Matres lectionis, which are consonantal letters used as vowels. Further diacritics like Dagesh and Sin and Shin dots are used to indicate variations in the pronunciation of the consonants (e.g. bet/vet, shin/sin).

Phonology 

Modern Hebrew has fewer phonemes than Biblical Hebrew but it has developed its own phonological complexity. Israeli Hebrew has 25 to 27 consonants, depending on whether the speaker has pharyngeals. It has 5 to 10 vowels, depending on whether diphthongs and long and short vowels are counted, varying with the speaker and the analysis.

This table lists the consonant phonemes of Israeli Hebrew in IPA transcription:

1 In modern Hebrew  for ח has been absorbed by  that was traditionally only for fricative כ, but some (mainly older) Mizrahi speakers still separate them.
2 The glottal consonants are elided in most unstressed syllables and sometimes also in stressed syllables, but they are pronounced in careful or formal speech.
3 Commonly transcribed . This is usually pronounced as a uvular fricative or approximant  or velar fricative , and sometimes as a uvular  or alveolar trill  or alveolar flap , depending on the background of the speaker.
4 The phonemes  were introduced through borrowings.

Obstruents often assimilate in voicing: voiceless obstruents become voiced when they appear immediately before voiced obstruents, and vice versa.

Hebrew has five basic vowel phonemes:

Long vowels occur unpredictably if two identical vowels were historically separated by a pharyngeal or glottal consonant, and the first was stressed.

Any of the five short vowels may be realized as a schwa  when it is far from lexical stress.

Most lexical words have lexical stress on one of the last two syllables, the last syllable being more frequent in formal speech. Loanwords may have stress on the antepenultimate syllable or even earlier.

Pronunciation
While the pronunciation of Modern Hebrew is based on Sephardi Hebrew, the pronunciation has been affected by the immigrant communities that have settled in Israel in the past century and there has been a general coalescing of speech patterns. The pharyngeal [] for the phoneme chet of Sephardi Hebrew has merged into [] which Sephardi Hebrew only used for fricative chaf. The pronunciation of the phoneme ayin has merged with the pronunciation of aleph, which is either [] or unrealized [∅] and has come to dominate Modern Hebrew, but in many variations of liturgical Sephardi Hebrew, it is [], a voiced pharyngeal fricative. The letter vav is realized as [], which is the standard for both Ashkenazi and most variations of Sephardi Hebrew. The Jews of Iraq, Aleppo, Yemen and some parts of North Africa pronounced vav as []. Yemenite Jews, during their liturgical readings in the synagogues, still use the latter, older pronunciation. The pronunciation of the letter resh has also largely shifted from Sephardi [] to either [] or [].

Morphology 
Modern Hebrew morphology (formation, structure, and interrelationship of words in a language) is essentially Biblical. Modern Hebrew showcases much of the inflectional morphology of the classical upon which it was based. In the formation of new words, all verbs and the majority of nouns and adjectives are formed by the classically Semitic devices of triconsonantal roots (shoresh) with affixed patterns (mishkal). Mishnaic attributive patterns are often used to create nouns, and Classical patterns are often used to create adjectives. Blended words are created by merging two bound stems or parts of words.

Syntax 

The syntax of Modern Hebrew is mainly Mishnaic but also shows the influence of different contact languages to which its speakers have been exposed during the revival period and over the past century.

Word order 
The word order of Modern Hebrew is predominately SVO (subject–verb–object). Biblical Hebrew was originally verb–subject–object (VSO), but drifted into SVO. Modern Hebrew maintains classical syntactic properties associated with VSO languages: it is prepositional, rather than postpositional, in making case and adverbial relations, auxiliary verbs precede main verbs; main verbs precede their complements, and noun modifiers (adjectives, determiners other than the definite article , and noun adjuncts) follow the head noun; and in genitive constructions, the possessee noun precedes the possessor. Moreover, Modern Hebrew allows and sometimes requires sentences with a predicate initial.

Lexicon 
Modern Hebrew has expanded its vocabulary effectively to meet the needs of casual vernacular, of science and technology, of journalism and belles-lettres. According to Ghil'ad Zuckermann:

Loanwords 
Modern Hebrew has loanwords from Arabic (both from the local Levantine dialect and from the dialects of Jewish immigrants from Arab countries), Aramaic, Yiddish, Judaeo-Spanish, German, Polish, Russian, English and other languages. Simultaneously, Israeli Hebrew makes use of words that were originally loanwords from the languages of surrounding nations from ancient times: Canaanite languages as well as Akkadian. Mishnaic Hebrew borrowed many nouns from Aramaic (including Persian words borrowed by Aramaic), as well as from Greek and to a lesser extent Latin. In the Middle Ages, Hebrew made heavy semantic borrowing from Arabic, especially in the fields of science and philosophy. Here are typical examples of Hebrew loanwords:

See also
Biblical Hebrew

References

Bibliography

External links

Modern Hebrew Swadesh list
 The Corpus of Spoken Israeli Hebrew - introduction by Tel Aviv University
 Hebrew Today – Should You Learn Modern Hebrew or Biblical Hebrew?
 History of the Ancient and Modern Hebrew Language by David Steinberg
 Short History of the Hebrew Language by Chaim Menachem Rabin
 Academy of the Hebrew Language: How a Word is Born

 
Canaanite languages
Hebrew
Hebrew words and phrases
Jewish languages
Language revival
Languages of Israel
Subject–verb–object languages